Garra quadratirostris is a species of cyprinid fish in the genus Garra which is found in India.

References 

Garra
Taxa named by Kongbrailatpan Nebeshwar Sharma
Taxa named by Waikhom Vishwanath
Fish described in 2013